Patrick Lamark Hawkins (December 4, 1970 – February 3, 1998), better known by his stage name Fat Pat (also known as Mr. Fat Pat), was an American rapper from Houston, Texas, who was a member of DEA (Dead End Alliance) with his brother John "Big Hawk" Hawkins, DJ Screw, and Kay-K, all original members of the Screwed Up Click (S.U.C.).

Wreckshop Records released his first two albums, Ghetto Dreams and Throwed in da Game in 1998 after his death. Later releases were on the Screwed Up Click label.

Death 
On February 3, 1998, Hawkins was fatally shot by an unknown gunman at 10440 South Drive, Houston, Texas, after going to a promoter's apartment to collect an appearance fee. The promoter was not home, and he was shot in the corridor outside the apartment. He was 27 years old. Fat Pat's murder still remains unsolved.

Eight years later, his brother, rapper Big Hawk, was also shot to death by an unknown assailant.

Legacy 
Houston-based UFC heavyweight contender Derrick Lewis uses Fat Pat's 1998 single Tops Drop as his walkout song when he fights, including when he fought Ciryl Gane for the UFC Heavyweight Championship at UFC 265 in Houston. As reported by the Houston Press, well over a decade since Hawkins' death, his music continues to be played heavily in the Houston area.

Discography

Albums 
1998: Ghetto Dreams
1998: Throwed in da Game
2001: Fat Pat's Greatest Hits
2004: Since The Gray Tapes
2005: Since The Gray Tapes Vol. 2
2008: I Had a Ghetto Dream

With Dead End Alliance 
1998: Screwed for Life

Singles

Featured singles

See also 
27 Club
Houston hip hop
List of murdered hip hop musicians
List of unsolved murders

References 

1970 births
1998 deaths
1998 murders in the United States
20th-century American male musicians
20th-century American rappers
African-American male rappers
Deaths by firearm in Texas
Male murder victims
Murdered African-American people
People murdered in Texas
Rappers from Houston
Screwed Up Click members
Underground rappers
Unsolved murders in the United States
20th-century African-American musicians